DGO Jet was a Mexican charter airline and was based in Mexico City.

History
The airline was established in 1995 with a sole Boeing 737-300. The following year more 737s were incorporated. The first wide-body aircraft, an Airbus A300, was incorporated in 1997 to operate regional routes and a Douglas DC-10 was added mid-year for flights to the US, Canada and Spain. In 1998, the airline had a debt of US$60,000, and due to their inability to pay, the airline ceased operations. The airline's IATA code was DGO.

Fleet
1 Airbus A300
3 Boeing 737-300
2 Douglas DC-10

References

Defunct airlines of Mexico
Airlines established in 1995
Airlines disestablished in 1998
1995 establishments in Mexico
1998 disestablishments in Mexico